Leighton Buzzard Golf Club is a golf club near Leighton Buzzard in Bedfordshire, England, not far from Mentmore Golf and Country Club. It lies north of Leighton Buzzard, just to the southwest of the village of Heath and Reach. It was established in September 1905. In 1942, petrol restrictions imposed upon the members resulted in 30 members quitting the club.

References

External links
Official site

Golf clubs and courses in Bedfordshire
Leighton Buzzard